Intresseklubben (English: "The Interest Club") was a Swedish panel show, aired in Sveriges Television between 2012 and 2015, based on the long-running BBC panel show QI.

The show was hosted by Johan Wester, with Anders Jansson as a permanent panellist.

Format
The format is largely based on the QI format, just as in the original there are four panellists (three guest panellists and one permanent panellist). The panellists are mostly comedians, but people from other fields have also appeared, such as astronaut Christer Fuglesang, rally co-driver Tina Thörner, clergyman K.G. Hammar and politicians Maria Wetterstrand and Gudrun Schyman. Each panellist has a buzzer that they can use to attract attention, usually the buzzers are themed to the episode's theme.

The questions asked are often deliberately misleading or very difficult to answer, and sometimes they are very simple questions about something everyone thinks they know the answer, when in fact the obvious answer is incorrect. Panellists can earn one point by giving the correct answer or one point for an answer which is incorrect but interesting; however, they will lose ten points for answers that are not only incorrect, but also painfully obvious. When this happens an alarm sounds and the incorrect answer is flashed on the screens behind the panel. The main objective is not necessarily to answer all questions correctly, but rather to get an interesting and funny discussion going about the topics presented.

The "General Ignorance" round is not played in Intresseklubben, instead each episode usually ends with a special round where panellists need to categorize various things or guess what belongs with what. Examples include the game "Boy, girl, or dish" played in the episode "Abnormt" in season 1 where panellists had to guess if a name in Spanish was a boy's name, a girl's name or a Spanish dish. In episode "Blötdjur" the game was called "Wet, wetter, or Anders Jansson?" and the panellists had to guess which of several options contain the highest percent water. For example, we learned that Lake Don Juan, which is the saltiest lake in the world, contains a lower percentage of water than a human – only about 56%.

Production
Intresseklubben is filmed in front of a live studio audience of around 400 people at the Scandic Star hotel in Lund. Each episode takes roughly 70 minutes to record, but is then edited down to fit into a 30-minute timeslot. Research for one season takes roughly 6 months to complete; some of it is borrowed from QI, but roughly 80% is fresh research done for Intresseklubben.

Episodes

Season A 
Just as in the British original QI the seasons follow the letters of the alphabet, and all episodes in season A have a title starting with the letter A. Eight episodes were broadcast on TV and an additional two were released exclusively on the web through SVT Play.

Season B 
The second series, consisting of 8 episodes covering the letter B, was recorded in August 2013 and aired on SVT1 during September and October the same year, plus 2 specials during the Christmas times.

Season C 
A third season, this time about the letter C, was recorded in June 2014 and aired during the autumn 2014. New guests in the C-season included comedians Marika Carlsson and David Batra, radio host Kodjo Akolor and high jumper and Olympic gold medallist Stefan Holm. The season premiere aired on 1 November.

Season D 
A D-season consisting of eight episodes aired during the autumn 2015. The episodes aired on Saturday nights at 9 PM, with the season premiere on 22 August.

References

External links
 Official SVT webpage

QI
Sveriges Television comedy shows
2010s Swedish television series